Two ships of the United States Navy have been named USS Lackawanna:

 was a sloop-of-war launched 9 August 1862 and sold on 30 July 1887
, was an oiler acquired by the US Navy 20 June 1942 and decommissioned 14 February 1946

United States Navy ship names